Guardian of the Horizon is the 16th in a series of historical mystery novels, written by Elizabeth Peters and featuring fictional sleuth and archaeologist Amelia Peabody.

Plot summary

The story begins in summer, 1907, ten years after the Emersons' expedition into the Nubian desert in The Last Camel Died at Noon, when the Emersons were lured to a Lost Oasis where the remains of a Meroitic - Ancient Egyptian civilization that had avoided the outside world for centuries still survived.  It was during that journey that the Emersons brought back Nefret Forth to live with them in England.  A messenger from the Lost Oasis now appears at their home in Kent, pleading for help for their friend, King Tarek, and they have no choice but to go to his aid, though they mistrust the young man who claims to be Tarek's younger half-brother.

This time it is Ramses who experiences the feeling of foreboding that normally assails Amelia, as they head off to the Sudan and into the desert to help their friend. Unlike their first trip, they bring a far larger force, in full awareness that the Lost Oasis will no longer be a secret no matter what the outcome of this expedition.  It soon becomes apparent that the Emersons are not the only ones interested in the Lost Oasis.  They run into too many people who are interested in their travel plans, and ultimately bring some unexpected guests with them.  These include a British adventurer who has in his company a mysterious young woman.  The girl unsuccessfully attempts to seduce Ramses, but he remains strangely attracted to her, although he is really in love with Nefret.

Upon their arrival, the family finds things have indeed become desperate for King Tarek, who has been deposed by the father of the duplicitous messenger who brought them to the oasis. The usurper's plan is to obtain the endorsement of the Emerson family in order to neutralise any popular resistance this regime.  Nefret, who up until now has seemed to miss her old life, is taken from the group and made to resume her position as high priestess.  When Amelia catches an intruder in their quarters, she is relieved to find that it is her old enemy and admirer Sethos, and he promises to help rescue Nefret.

Amelia is up to her usual plotting and lists, Emerson is as bombastic as ever, Ramses plays the part of the action hero, and the assistance of Selim and Daoud becomes essential to the Father of Curses and the Sitt Hakim.

Chronologically, this book covers the time period immediately after The Ape Who Guards the Balance, although it was published some years later than the books that follow it chronologically.

See also

List of characters in the Amelia Peabody series

Amelia Peabody
2004 novels
Fiction set in 1907
Historical mystery novels
Novels set in the 1910s
Novels set in Sudan